Defu MRT station is a future underground Mass Rapid Transit (MRT) station on the Cross Island MRT line (CRL) in Hougang planning area, Singapore. It will be located at Tampines Road at the junction of Defu Avenue 2 and will serve the industries near Tampines Road and Defu Industrial Park.

History
On 25 January 2019, the Land Transport Authority (LTA) announced that Defu station would be part of the proposed Cross Island line (CRL). The station will be constructed as part of Phase 1 (CRL1), consisting of 12 stations between Aviation Park and Bright Hill. CRL1 was expected to be completed in 2029. However, the restrictions imposed on construction works due to the COVID-19 pandemic led to delays and the CRL1 completion date was pushed by one year to 2030.

The contract for the construction of bored tunnels between this station and Tampines North station was awarded to Nishimatsu Construction Co Ltd on 8 November 2021 at S$446 million (US$ million). As part of the contract, a facility building will be constructed to fulfil the electrical and mechanical requirements for the line. A large-diameter tunnel boring machine will be used to construct a tunnel with double tracks. Tunnelling through abrasive alluvium soil, the boring machine has to be closely monitored for wear and tear. Construction for these tunnels will start in December 2021.

The contract for the design and construction of Defu Station and associated tunnels was awarded to a joint venture between Gamuda Berhad Singapore Branch and Wai Fong Construction Pte Ltd on 22 February 2022 at S$467 million (US$ million). Construction is expected to begin in the second quarter of 2022, with an expected completion date of 2030. Construction of the station required excavation into mixed ground conditions of marine clay and sandy and silty clay.

References

Proposed railway stations in Singapore
Mass Rapid Transit (Singapore) stations
Railway stations scheduled to open in 2030